Sufian (also Romanized as Şūfīān and Şūfīyān) is a village in Tamran Rural District, in the Central District of Kalaleh County, Golestan Province, Iran. At the 2006 census, its population was 1,468, in 267 families.

References 

Populated places in Kalaleh County